Antonio Raymondi is a province of the Ancash Region in Peru. It is located along the central eastern edge of the Ancash Region, bordering the Huánuco Region.

Overview
The province was split off from Huari Province in 1964 at the request of the inhabitants of its seat, Llamellín, and named after the native Italian geographer Antonio Raimondi, a prominent Peruvian scientist in the later half of the 19th century. He wrote the book "Departamento de Ancachs".

Geography 
Other mountains are listed below:

Ethnic groups 
The people in the province are mainly indigenous citizens of Quechua descent. Quechua is the language which the majority of the population (76.21%) learnt to speak in childhood, 23.32% of the residents started speaking using the Spanish language (2007 Peru Census).

Political division
Antonio Raimondi is divided into six districts, which are:
 Aczo 
 Chaccho 
 Chingas 
 Llamellín 
 Mirgas 
 San Juan de Rontoy

References 

Antonio Raimondi Province